Mohammadpur or Muhammadpur means City of Mohammad. Mohammadpur may refer to:

 Mohammadpur Central University College, Dhaka, Bangladesh
 Mohammadpur Government High School, Dhaka, Bangladesh
 Mohammadpur Preparatory and Higher Secondary School, Dhaka, Bangladesh
 Mohammadpur Thana, Dhaka District, Bangladesh
 Mohammadpur Upazila, an Upazila of Magura District, Khulna, Bangladesh
 Mohammadpur, Bihar, a town in Bihar, India
 Mohammadpur Gaunti, a village in Uttar Pradesh, India
 Mohanpur Mohammadpur, a town in Hardwar district in the Indian state of Uttarakhand
 Muhammadpur, a neighbourhood of SITE Town in Karachi, Sindh, Pakistan